Ivanildo Marques da Silva (Recife, November 15, 1954), better known by his stage name Conde Só Brega or Conde, is a Brazilian singer and songwriter.

The artist is known for being the lead singer of the band O Conde & Banda Só Brega, which released hits of brega music in Pernambuco between the 1990s and 2000s.

Discography

Studio albums
20 Super Sucessos: Banda Só Brega (Somax Estúdios, INC): 2014

References 

1954 births
Living people
Brazilian male composers
21st-century composers
21st-century male musicians